Glasston is a farming town located in Saint Thomas Township in North Dakota's Pembina County, United States. It consists of a post office, a general store, and a handful of houses. It was established in 1886 as a station along the Great Northern Railroad. Originally called Baltimore, the site was later renamed for Archibald Glass, its first postmaster. The population of the village has rarely exceeded 100 since it was established.

Glasston is located on the west side of North Dakota State Highway 81, approximately midway between Hamilton and Saint Thomas. Even though it is unincorporated it has a post office with the ZIP code 58236.

References

External links
Pioneer Women's Histories : St. Thomas and Glasston from the Digital Horizons website

Populated places in Pembina County, North Dakota
Populated places established in 1886
1886 establishments in Dakota Territory